Zakrytoye Predpriyatiye was a new wave band from Novosibirsk, Russia, that existed from 1986 to 1994.

History

1980s
The group was founded in 1986. The first line-up was Arkady Golovin, Andrey Barkov and Nikolay Dizendorf. And in the same year, the band started working on their first album, Komendatura. During recording, the drum parts were recorded using a drum machine.

In December 1986, the band was joined Igor Oleshkevich but in the summer he left them. 

In April 1987, Zakrytoye Predpriyatiye performed at the first festival of the Novosibirsk Rock Club, after which the band immediately became a member of this organization. At the same time, the first album was completed, which was released in small numbers.

In the fall of 1987, the band became a member of another Novosibirsk rock club Studio-8.

In 1988, the band took part in the Irkutsk Rock Festival and took first place. At this time, drummer Renat Vakhidov joins the band. Previously, he was a member of such musical groups as Bomzh, Tekhniki Sveta and Promyshlennaya Arkhitektura.

In 1988, the group completed the second album Konstruktsiya and, in addition, was shot on Novosibirsk television. But their clip I owe no one (Я никому не должен) was banned due to censorship.

In the winter of 1988 and 1989, Zakrytoye Predpriyatiye recorded three songs together with Yanka Dyagileva. At the same time, the group begins to work on new songs, some of which will then be included in their 1989 album.

In mid-1989, the new line-up was formed: Arkady Golovin, Sergey Exuziyan and Alexander Zhukovsky. For some time, the keyboard player Galina Klimkovich worked with the band, the album Summer in Washington was recorded with her participation.

In the fall of 1989, the band participated in the festival Next Stop Rock'n'Roll - 89, organized by Sergey Bugaev.

1990s
In 1990, the group, as the opening band, went on tour with the Moscow band Technologiya.

In 1991, the Leningrad television made the TV show about electronic music, which was just beginning to appear in Russia. The musicians of the Zakrytoye Predpriyatiye took part in the television programme with Natalya Vetlitskaya, Igor Selivyorstov, the bands Technologiya, Arrival and Malchishnik.

In the early 1990s, the musical activity of the group was at the peak of a wave, but by 1992–1993, the band members were losing interest in their musical creativity. It is possible that one of the reasons for the decline in their creative activity was the rejection of new business rules regarding commercial music.

The group sometimes performed rare concerts in Novosibirsk and Novosibirsk Oblast, the last of which was held in the Otdykh Club (Kalininsky District) on Christmas Eve 1994.

Discography

Singles
 1986 – Сонный пляж

Studio albums
 1987 – Комендатура
 1988 – Инфляция
 1988 – Конструкция
 1989 – Лето в Вашингтоне
 1990 – ЗП
 1993 – Сборник ЗП

Music videos
 Я никому не должен

References

External links
 Collective: Zakrytoye Predpryatiye. Novosibirsk State Conservatory named after M. I. Glinka. Коллектив: «Закрытое предприятие». Новосибирская Государственная консерватория имени М. И. Глинки.

Musical groups established in 1986
Musical groups from Novosibirsk
Russian new wave musical groups